Tiumpan Head (Scottish Gaelic:Rubha an Tiùmpain or Rudha an Tiùmpain) is the north-eastern end of the Point peninsula on the Isle of Lewis in the Outer Hebrides of Scotland. Tiumpan Head Lighthouse has marked the western limit of The Minch since 1900.

Footnotes

Headlands of Scotland
Landforms of the Outer Hebrides